Anatoly Nikolayevich Demitkov (27 May 1926 – 15 August 2005) was a Soviet canoeist. He took the silver medal in the K-2 1000 m event at the 1956 Summer Olympics in Melbourne together with Mikhail Kaaleste. They went on to win the European Championship in 1957 and took third place at the 1958 Flatwater Racing World Championship in Prague.

Biography
Anatoly Nikolayevich Demitkov was born on 27 May 1926 and fought in the Red Army during World War II. He began his sports career with DSO Spartak.

Anatoly Demitkov and his doubles partner Mikhail Kaaleste competed in the K-2 1000 m event at the 1956 Summer Olympics in Melbourne, Australia after finishing first in their qualifying heat in 3:55.1. They subsequently took the silver medal for their second-place finish in 3:51.4, coming behind West German Michael Scheuer and Meinrad Miltenberger, who finished 1.7 seconds faster in 3:49.6. They went on to win a gold medal at the 1957 European Championship.

Kaaleste and Demitkov finished third at the K-2 1000 m event at the 1958 ICF Canoe Sprint World Championships (Flatwater Racing World Championship) in Prague in 1958 and also took a second bronze for their K-4 1000 m finish at the same championship.

He worked as a trainer for DSO Spartak in 1963-1986.

Anatoly Demitkov died on 15 August 2005.

Honours and awards
 Order of the Patriotic War, 2nd class 
 Order of the Badge of Honour
 Medal "For the Defence of the Soviet Transarctic"
 Medal "For the Victory over Germany in the Great Patriotic War 1941–1945"

References

External links

Anatoly Demitkov's profile at Sports Reference.com

1926 births
2005 deaths
Canoeists at the 1956 Summer Olympics
Olympic canoeists of the Soviet Union
Olympic medalists in canoeing
Russian male canoeists
Soviet male canoeists
Soviet military personnel of World War II
ICF Canoe Sprint World Championships medalists in kayak
Medalists at the 1956 Summer Olympics
Olympic silver medalists for the Soviet Union